Philipp Kohlschreiber was the defending champion but lost to Tommy Haas in the semifinals.
Eventually, Haas won the title after defeating Roger Federer in the final by 7–6(7–5), 6–4.

Seeds
The top four seeds receive a bye into the second round.

Draw

Finals

Top half

Bottom half

Qualifying

Seeds

Qualifiers

Draw

First qualifier

Second qualifier

Third qualifier

Fourth qualifier

References
 Main Draw
 Qualifying Draw

2012 Gerry Weber Open